Aphrosylopsis is a genus of flies in the family Dolichopodidae. It is endemic to the Bounty Islands of New Zealand. It contains only one species, Aphrosylopsis lineata (sometimes known as Aphrosylopsis lineatus).

References 

Dolichopodidae genera
Hydrophorinae
Diptera of New Zealand
Monotypic Diptera genera
Endemic insects of New Zealand